Stony Plain may refer to:

 Reg, a landform consisting in a vast desertic stony plain
 Stony Plain, Alberta, a town in Canada
 Stony Plain (electoral district), a provincial electoral district in Alberta
 Stony Plain 135, Alberta, an Indian Reserve in Canada
 Stony Plain Records, a Canadian independent record label
 Stony Plains, a bioregion of Australia